Tirupathur division is a revenue division in the Tirupathur district of Tamil Nadu, India.

It comprises the Taluks of

1.Vaniyambadi,

2.Ambur,

3.Tirupattur and

4.Natrampalli

References 
 

Tirupathur district